Dijla Sport Club, is an Iraqi football team based in Maysan, that plays in the Iraq Division Two.

Managerial history
  Mohammed Jassim

See also 
 2021–22 Iraq Division Two

References

External links
 Iraq Clubs- Foundation Dates

2004 establishments in Iraq
Association football clubs established in 2004
Football clubs in Maysan